St Ann's Well Road Congregational Church is a former Congregational Church on St Ann's Well Road in Nottingham.

History

The congregational was established from Castle Gate Congregational Centre. The church was built on the corner of St Ann’s Well Road and Alfred Street in Nottingham. It was designed by architect Richard Charles Sutton and constructed by Mr. Wright of Portland Road. It cost £1,600 and had seating for 500 people. It was opened on 16 March 1870.

Stanwell Players

The church gained a reputation for its drama group, the Stanwell Players, formed in July 1946. Their first production was Little Ladyship in January 1947. Profits were donated to charitable causes, initially the London Missionary Society. 
When the Church closed in 1970, the Stanwell Players moved to Castle Gate Congregational Centre, and in 1975 to St. Andrew with Castlegate United Reformed Church. The group closed in 1991.

Closure

It closed in 1970 and the congregation merged with Castle Gate Congregational Centre. Due to the redevelopment of the St Ann's area the church was subsequently demolished.

Ministers

Robert Dawson 1870 - 1881
James Bruce 1881 - 1883
Walter J.S. Davis 1883 - 1888 
C.N. Barham 1889 - 1894
John D. Allen 1896 - 1904 
Heber Rosier 1905 - 1912 
John Frankland 1912 - 1920 
William H. Tame 1920 - 1922 
Stanley B. Green 1923 - 1928 
Ronald K. Ross 1929 - 1971

References

Religious organizations established in 1870
Churches completed in 1870
Religious organizations disestablished in 1970
Congregational churches in Nottingham